Afijio is a Local Government Area in Oyo State, Nigeria. Its headquarter is in the town of Jobele.

It has an area of 722 km and a population of 134,173 at the 2006 census.

The postal code of the area is 211.

In 1989, the then-Federal Military Government chose to separate the former Oyo Local Government Area into autonomous council districts, resulting in the formation of the current Afijio Local Government.

Afijio Local Council, as history has it, has been established three (3) times. The Afijio Provisional Authority was established in 1964. Second, in 1981, the entire area was merged with Oyo Local Government before it was reestablished as an autonomous political entity in May 1989 under the name Afijio, which is an acronym for Awe, Akinmoorin, Fiditi, Ilora, Imini, Jobele, Iware, Iluaje, Oluwatedo, and Ojutaye, the major towns that comprise the Local Government.

Afijio Local Government is mostly controlled by Yorubas, however there are hundreds of other indigenous groups dwelling in various sections of the area. The indigenous peoples' primary religions are Christianity and Islam. Nonetheless, traditional believers operate freely within the council's jurisdiction. The indigenous people of Afijio Local Government are largely farmers who grow a wide range of agricultural goods such as maize, yam, cassava, groundnut, fruit, cocoa and oil palm.

Political Wards in Afijio Local Government Area 
The local government is governed by an elected chairman and 10 councilors elected from each ward.

Afijio local government area is sub-divided into 10 wards: Ilora I, Ilora II, Ilora III, Fiditi I, Fiditi II, Aawe I, Aawe II, Akinmorin/Jobele, Iware and Imini.

Prominent towns and villages in Afijio 

 Aawe
 Fiditi
 Ilora
 Iware
 Jobele
 Ore lope

References

Local Government Areas in Oyo State